The Audubon Society of the District of Columbia, also known as DC Audubon Society, is a local chapter of the National Audubon Society.  It was established in 1999.

The organization's goal is to "promote the appreciation and conservation of birds and their habitats through the participation of those in the DC area."  It sponsors lectures, field trips and an annual winter bird count in the Chesapeake and Ohio Canal National Historical Park.

DC Audubon also works with area organizations on conservation programs, including restoring songbird habitat in Rock Creek Park.

References

External links
 DC Audubon Society - official site

Audubon movement
Non-profit organizations based in Washington, D.C.
Ornithological organizations in the United States